Derk Gerard Willem Spitzen (18 March 1896, Wageningen – 26 January 1957, The Hague) was a Dutch politician.

References
Mr. D.G.W. Spitzen at www.parlement.com

1896 births
1957 deaths
Ministers of Transport and Water Management of the Netherlands
People from Wageningen
Leiden University alumni